Vrbani may refer to:

 Vrbani, Zagreb, a neighbourhood of western Zagreb
 Vrbani, Istria County, a village near Vižinada